Zélée may refer to:

Zélée Glacier, a glacier in Antarctica
Zélée Rocks, a group of rocks in Bransfield Strait off the north tip of Antarctic Peninsula
Zélée Subglacial Trench, a subglacial valley on George V Coast off Antarctica
French gunboat Zélée, a French Navy gunboat sunk in 1914